Kenneth K. Wong is an American political scientist, currently the Walter and Leonore Annenberg Professor of Education Policy, Chair of Education, Professor of Urban Studies and Professor of International and Public Affairs, Professor of Political Science at Brown University. He has been listed in Who's Who in American Education, Who's Who in the Midwest, Who's Who Among Asian Americans, Who's Who in the World.

References

Year of birth missing (living people)
Living people
Brown University faculty
American political scientists
University of Chicago alumni